Alan Murray Muir (2 January 1922 – 20 September 1996) was an Australian rules footballer who played for the Fitzroy Football Club in the Victorian Football League (VFL).

Muir later served in the Australian Army during the latter part of World War II.

Notes

External links 

1922 births
1996 deaths
Australian rules footballers from Victoria (Australia)
Fitzroy Football Club players
Ivanhoe Amateurs Football Club players